You Can't Pray a Lie is the debut studio album of American garage rock band Laughing Hyenas. It was released in 1989 by Touch and Go Records. It was reissued in 1992 accompanied with Life of Crime.

Critical reception
Trouser Press praised Larissa Strickland's guitar playing. MusicHound Rock: The Essential Album Guide called the album "a perfect coalescing of the violence of punk and the guitar stomp of the coming grunge sound." Andrew Earles, in Gimme Indie Rock: 500 Essential American Underground Rock Albums 1981-1996, wrote that "many albums throughout rock-and-roll's history could carry the additional signifier 'hard-living set to music,' but few are as convincing as the albums made by Laughing Hyenas."

Track listing

Personnel
Adapted from the You Can't Pray a Lie liner notes.

Laughing Hyenas
John Brannon – lead vocals, trumpet
Jim Kimball – drums
Kevin Strickland – bass guitar
Larissa Strickland – guitar

Production and additional personnel
Laughing Hyenas – production
Butch Vig – production, engineering, recording

Release history

References

External links 
 

1989 debut albums
Touch and Go Records albums
Laughing Hyenas albums
Albums produced by Butch Vig